Skyview or SkyView may refer to:
 Skyview Lounge, a type of streamlined railway passenger car
 Skyview School (disambiguation)

Aviation
 Skyview Airways, based in Bangkok, Thailand
 Skyview UAV, a range of Chinese unmanned aerial vehicles

Buildings
 Skyview (house), a Marshall Erdman Prefab House designed by Frank Lloyd Wright
 SkyView Drive-In and SkyView Theater, both in Litchfield, Illinois, US

Lifts and rides
 Skyview (Ericsson Globe), an exterior inclined elevator in Stockholm, Sweden
 SkyView (US Thrill Rides), a proposed concept for an unbuilt design of Ferris wheel
 SkyView Atlanta, a transportable Ferris wheel installation in Georgia, US

Populated places
 Skyview (Ottawa), in Ontario, Canada
 Skyview Drive, in Missoula, Montana, US
 Skyview Estates, a community on Blackstrap Lake, Saskatchewan, Canada
 Skyview Ranch, Calgary, a residential neighbourhood in Alberta, Canada
 Calgary Skyview, a future federal electoral district in Alberta, Canada

Entertainment
 Skyview (album), 2021 album by American musician AJ Mitchell